The Revolutionary Socialist League (RSL) was a Trotskyist group in Britain which existed from 1956 to 1964, when it became Militant, an entryist group in the Labour Party.

Formation

After the dissolution of the Revolutionary Communist Party, Ted Grant and his supporters were expelled from the RCP's successor The Club in 1950 and formed the International Socialist Group.   They went on to fuse with supporters of the International Secretariat of the Fourth International in Britain as the Revolutionary Socialist League in 1956 and were recognised as the official British section at its fifth world congress in 1957. The RSL held its first congress in 1957.

It was an entryist group within the Labour Party that published Socialist Fight. In 1958 the group was recognised as the British section of the International Secretariat of the Fourth International and, after the reunification in 1963, the British section of the Fourth International. However, the League registered substantial political differences at the 1965 World Congress, and failed to integrate other supporters of the International in Britain. The Congress recognised two sympathising sections in Britain: the RSL and what became the International Marxist Group, prompting the RSL to turn its back on the International. In 1964, the RSL founded the newspaper Militant and the group itself soon became known by this name, although the official name was still used internally.

References

External links
Catalogue of the RSL archives, held at the Modern Records Centre, University of Warwick

Political parties established in 1957
Political parties disestablished in 1964
Defunct Trotskyist organisations in the United Kingdom
Fourth International (post-reunification)
Entryists
1957 establishments in the United Kingdom
1964 disestablishments in the United Kingdom

ru:Революционная социалистическая лига (Великобритания)